Game Jolt is a social community platform for video games, gamers and content creators. It is available on iOS, Android, on the web and as a desktop app for Windows and Linux. Primarily for Gen Z, users share interactive content through a variety of formats including images, videos, live streams, chat rooms, and virtual events.

Game Jolt was founded by Yaprak and David DeCarmine.

Features

Crowd streaming 
In 2021 Game Jolt revealed their own live streaming feature called Firesides. Firesides allow multiple users to simultaneously live stream together with near 0-second delay. The feature launched with a virtual concert showcasing its ability to accommodate multiple streamers.

Mobile app 
Game Jolt Social by Game Jolt Inc. launched on both the Apple App Store and Google Play Store in March 2022. “It’s clear to us that Gen Z is tired of generic social media and they want a place specifically for gaming that supports all types of content they’re creating–art, videos, thoughts, and livestreams all in one place.” said Game Jolt founder and CEO Yaprak DeCarmine, in a statement to VentureBeat.

Desktop app 
Game Jolt Client is a desktop application version of the website.

Game API 
The Game Jolt Application Programming Interface (usually known as the Game Jolt Game API) allows any developer using a game development platform that supports HTTP operations and MD5 or SHA-1. Game Jolt advertises that the API can:
 Create multiple "scoreboards" which collect high scores from players made publicly available on the game's profile and give user accounts EXP
 Award player's trophies which give user accounts EXP
 Store game data on Game Jolt's data servers

Game Jams and Competitions 
Game Jolt regularly hosts Game Jams where participants are encouraged to develop games for a chance to win prizes.

Game Jolt hosted their first game jam in 2009, Shocking Contest.

In November 2014 Game Jolt announced the "Indies vs PewDiePie" game jam, partnering with the popular Youtuber Felix "PewDiePie" Kjellberg.

Developers were given a weekend (21–24 November) to create a game with the theme of "fun to play, fun to watch" to suit the Let's Plays entertainment style. Users could rate entries afterwards until December 1 when the scores were counted up. The prize to the top 10 rated games was Felix playing the games on his channel as a means of promotion for the developers, although later he played other entries.

One of the participants of the jam, now known as Outerminds Inc. was discovered and hired by PewDiePie to develop his mobile game, Legend of the Brofist.

Game Jolt partnered with Felix, Sean "Jacksepticeye" McLoughlin and Mark "Markiplier" Fischbach to host "Indies vs Gamers" in July 2015. The requirements for entries were arcade games using the Game Jolt Game API highscore tables, to be made between the July 17–20 and the top 5 games were played on the partner's YouTube channels.

Following the  "Indies vs PewDiePie" game jam in 2014, Game Jolt released their internal jam hosting tools public for all users to use as a service, to create their own game jams that integrated with the main site.

Today Game Jolt focuses on hosting and co-hosting game competitions with established brands in order to bring monetary and educational opportunities to their users.

Contests

Events 

Game Jolt hosts both physical and virtual events to entertain and prank its users.

Physical Events

April Fools 
Since 2015 Game Jolt has made announcements on April Fools' Day, often implementing site features that remain accessible beyond 1 April.

History 

Game Jolt has supported independent creators with a central platform to manage their content and communities since its start in 2002. David DeCarmine began development of Game Jolt at the age of 14 for a group of hobbyists, making games and sharing on forums in an early iteration known as Holo World. The original intention was to create a platform for gamers where new games could be discoverable and quickly playable, and where feedback could be provided directly to the creators, allowing them to continue improving their games.

In 2008, Game Jolt was registered as an LLC, then incorporated as Game Jolt Inc. in September 2020.

A new site launched in 2015 featuring a responsive design, automated curation for both games and game news articles which weighs how recent a game was uploaded and how popular it is ("hot") and filtering options on game listings for platform, maturity rating and development status.

In March 2022, Game Jolt launched a mobile application simultaneously on the Google Play Store and Apple App Store for Gen Z gamers and creators. While in beta, the mobile app had 100,000 installs pre-launch.

Game store 
Game Jolt continues to host a large library of independent games. Game developers can upload their games directly to the site to share or sell.

Game Jolt supported distribution for downloadable games then added support for Flash, Unity and Java games which allowed support for browser based games. In February 2013, Game Jolt built support for browser-based HTML5 games as well.

Game Jolt Jams released in early 2014 as a service to allow users to create their own game jams that integrated with the main site.

An online marketplace was announced in April 2016 and released the following month with an exclusive set of game titles, including Bendy and the Ink Machine, allowing developers to sell their games on the site.

In January 2016, Game Jolt released source code of the client and site's frontend on GitHub under MIT license. 

In January 2022 Game Jolt suddenly banned Adult games from appearing on the site, stating in an e-mail to developers that the site had become "social media platform" and they "had to make decisions around the direction and future of the brand which has now included the removal of hosted games with explicitly adult content." And also stated in a tweet "Game Jolt is a platform with a large audience of 13-16 year olds. Our users asked us to clean up, so here we are.” Which was in response to a Tweet by Itch.io saying that site is not for prudes.

Investments 
After bootstrapping Game Jolt with revenue earned from ads on the website for years, the DeCarmines secured venture capital in 2020 from SoftBank then again in 2021 from founders of Twitch, Rec Room, Modio and more.

References

External links

Video game websites
Social media companies
Community-building organizations
Live streaming services
Mobile applications